Kehlani Ashley Parrish (born April 24, 1995) is an American singer, songwriter, and dancer. Kehlani is originally from Oakland, California, and achieved initial fame as a member of the teen group Poplyfe in 2011.

In 2014, Kehlani released their first commercial mixtape, Cloud 19. The mixtape was listed as one of the Complexs "50 Best Albums of 2014." Their second commercial mixtape, You Should Be Here (2015), debuted at number 5 on the R&B/Hip-Hop chart. In 2016, they were nominated for the Grammy Award for Best Urban Contemporary Album for You Should Be Here. Kehlani released their debut studio album, SweetSexySavage, in 2017. They released their second studio album It Was Good Until It Wasn't in 2020. They released their third studio album Blue Water Road on April 29, 2022.

Early life
Kehlani Ashley Parrish was born on April 24, 1995, in Oakland, California. They were adopted and raised by their aunt when their mother, who had a drug addiction, served time in jail. Kehlani's father, who also had a drug addiction, died when they were a toddler. During their teenage years, they attended the Oakland School for the Arts, where they initially practiced dance, particularly ballet and modern dance.

Early in their life, Kehlani aspired to train as a dancer at the Juilliard School, but they had a knee injury in junior high, which led them to turn their attention towards singing. While living with their aunt, Kehlani was exposed almost exclusively to R&B and neo soul artists, such as Lauryn Hill, Erykah Badu and Jill Scott, whom today they describe as some of their early musical influences. When they were 14, Kehlani was recruited to join a local pop cover band, Poplyfe.

Career

2009–2013: Beginnings with PopLyfe 
Kehlani's singing career effectively began when they started out as a member and lead vocalist for the group called PopLyfe. The band's music was produced by former Tony! Toni! Tone! member D'Wayne Wiggins. Within two years, the group performed throughout the Bay Area and other cities. In 2011, they auditioned for the sixth season of America's Got Talent, and eventually finished in fourth place. During their final appearance, judge Piers Morgan told Kehlani, "You've got real talent, but I don't think you need the group."

After the end of America's Got Talent, Kehlani left PopLyfe, because of several managerial and contractual disputes. Over six months, they avoided doing anything music related to avoid being sued by the group's management. In 2012 and 2013, Kehlani was effectively homeless, moving from house to house and often sleeping on couches. During their senior year of high school, they moved to Los Angeles, California, with no legal guardian. In 2013, Nick Cannon, who had been the host of America's Got Talent during PopLyfe's run, called Kehlani to ask about being in a rap group. They agreed at first and went to Los Angeles, but, ultimately didn't like the direction of the group and moved back to Oakland. To help with money and food, they decided to begin stealing iPhones to sell, and items from grocery stores for a short time. Months later, Kehlani released their first solo track on SoundCloud, called "ANTISUMMERLUV". Cannon called back after hearing the song and he bought them an apartment in LA, along with studio time.

2014–2017: SweetSexySavage 

In 2014, the studio time culminated in the release of their first mixtape, called Cloud 19. The mixtape features guest appearances from Kyle Dion. Cannon also sent them to New York City to work with record producer Jahaan Sweet. The mixtape ranked at twenty-eighth on Complex's list of the "50 Best Albums of 2014," and was also listed among Pitchfork's "Overlooked Mixtapes 2014." A song they released in late 2014, "Till the Morning" was placed by Billboard as one of the "Emerging Picks of the Week" on November 7, 2014. In 2015, Kehlani opened for American rapper G-Eazy on the second leg of his From the Bay to the Universe tour.

On April 28, 2015, they released their second mixtape You Should Be Here. Billboard called it the "year's first great R&B album", when it debuted at number 5 on the US Billboard Top R&B/Hip-Hop Albums. The project features guest appearances from fellow American rapper Chance the Rapper and American singer BJ the Chicago Kid. A week after the release, they announced that they had signed a deal to Atlantic Records. In support of the Mixtape,  they went on the You Should Be Here tour, which sold out every North American date and select European dates. Throughout 2015,  they also received individual plaudits: Complex called them one of the "15 Artists to Watch Out for in 2015" and Rolling Stone named them one of the "10 New Artists You Need to Know". They were also nominated for a 2016 Grammy Award for Best Urban Contemporary Album. In March 2016, Kehlani was featured on English singer and friend Zayn on his single, "Wrong" from his debut solo studio album Mind of Mine. Their song "Gangsta" was featured on the soundtrack for the August 2016 hit movie Suicide Squad, which gave them and their music some beneficial recognition, as it reached number 41 on the Hot 100.

On November 26, 2016, Kehlani revealed the title of their debut studio album SweetSexySavage, which was released on Atlantic Records on January 27, 2017. In December 2017, Kehlani was featured on American rapper Eminem's single "Nowhere Fast", from his ninth studio album Revival. Kehlani's third annual Tsunami Christmas tour concluded in Santa Ana, California on December 18, 2017.

2018present: It Was Good Until It Wasn't and Blue Water Road
Kehlani served as an opening act on American singer Demi Lovato's Tell Me You Love Me World Tour in North America, which started on February 26, 2018 and concluded on April 2, 2018. They then opened on American singer Halsey's Hopeless Fountain Kingdom World Tour on the Oceania leg during April 2018. In March 2018, Kehlani was featured on American singer Charlie Puth's single "Done for Me", from his second studio album, Voicenotes. In April 2018, they were featured on American rapper Cardi B's single "Ring", from Cardi B's debut studio album, Invasion of Privacy. The song entered at number 28 on the Billboard Hot 100, making Kehlani's first top 40 entry on the chart.

On February 22, 2019, their third commercial mixtape While We Wait was released by Atlantic Records and debuted at number nine on the US Billboard 200. The mixtape had 34,000 album-equivalent units in its first week. It is supported by singles, "Nights Like This" featuring Ty Dolla Sign, "Nunya" featuring Dom Kennedy, and "Butterfly".

On September 27, 2019, Kehlani and Russian-German DJ Zedd released a collaborative single titled "Good Thing." Kehlani and American singer Teyana Taylor's then released a single titled "Morning" on November 1, 2019.

On January 28, 2020, Kehlani was featured on Canadian singer Justin Bieber's promotional single, "Get Me", from his fifth studio album, Changes. They were also set to be a supporting act alongside American rapper and singer Jaden Smith for Bieber's Changes Tour, which was pushed back due to the COVID-19 pandemic. The tour was pushed back to 2022 and renamed the Justice World Tour to support both Changes and its successor, Bieber's sixth studio album, Justice (2021), but Kehlani was no longer an opening act. Kehlani released their second studio album, It Was Good Until It Wasn't on May 8, 2020. It debuted at number two on the US Billboard 200, based on 83,000 album-equivalent units earned (including 25,000 copies of pure album sales).

In September 2020, Kehlani recorded songs for the deluxe version of It Was Good Until It Wasn't. However, after the session they decided that the songs would fit better on a separate project, and began working on their third studio album, Blue Water Road. On September 14, 2021, Kehlani revealed the teaser for Blue Water Road, and announced that the album will be released late that year. The album's lead single "Altar" was released on September 15. The second single, "Little Story", was released on February 24, 2022. On March 24, Kehlani took to their Instagram that their album would be released April 29. The following week, the singer released "Up at Night", featuring Justin Bieber, as the third single from the album.

Personal life
In January 2016, it was confirmed that Kehlani was in a relationship with star NBA point guard Kyrie Irving. In March 2016, Canadian musician PartyNextDoor posted a picture of Kehlani's hand on Instagram, insinuating that they were in bed together. This caused a media controversy across Twitter, in which abuse was tweeted against Kehlani in hundreds of thousands of posts. Kehlani soon after attempted suicide. Irving later stated on Twitter that they had broken up before the incident. Kehlani took to social media to explain that they did not cheat on Irving in a public statement to acknowledge their attempted suicide in the wake of the media attention. In 2018, Irving penned an apology to Kehlani via an Instagram post, expressing appreciation towards the singer, and they responded wishing him well.

On September 6, 2019, it was confirmed that Kehlani was dating American rapper YG, but after three months of dating, Kehlani and YG broke up. However, the two released a collaborative single for Valentine's Day, "Konclusions", on February 14, 2020. In May 2020, during an interview with The Breakfast Club, Kehlani said that they discovered that YG was cheating on them after seeing his phone. YG apologized by filling their lawn with roses. Kehlani added that they do not speak, but remain cordial.

Kehlani announced that they were pregnant with their first child, a girl, on Instagram on October 12, 2018, with the father being Javaughn Young-White, who plays guitar for Kehlani. They opened up in December 2018 about prenatal depression and how their pregnancy is harder than it might look. On March 23, 2019, Kehlani gave birth to a daughter at home. Kehlani is vegan. They have spoken about their past experiences being a survivor of sexual assault and rape. In the summer of 2020, Kehlani bought a small farm in Simi Valley, California, where they live with their daughter. They were in a relationship with the 070 collective member, Danielle Balbuena, better known as 070 Shake.

Sexuality and gender identity
In April 2018, they said about their sexuality on Twitter, stating, "I'm queer. Not bi, not straight. I'm attracted to women, men, REALLY attracted to queer men, non-binary people, intersex people, trans people. lil poly pansexual". 
After that, during a live stream in early 2021, Kehlani announced that they identify as a lesbian, after having publicly identified as queer and pansexual in the past. They prefer polyamorous relationships. They have stated that it is important for them to include female pronouns in their music. 

In an April 2019 interview with Diva magazine, Kehlani stated they are "definitely on the non-binary scale" although preferred "she" pronouns. In December 2020, Kehlani updated their pronouns on Twitter to "she/they". In an interview with Byrdie Magazine in 2021, they stated their preference for "they" over "she", because "something feels really affirming when people say they", and that "it feels like you really see me".

Tattoos
Kehlani got their first tattoo when they were sixteen. Some of their tattoos include Coraline, Regina "Reggie" Rocket, Mia Wallace and Vincent Vega dancing, Lauryn Hill, Frida Kahlo, a sleeve of roses, a sunflower, and face tattoos of a paper plane and four dots.

In an interview with Power 106, Kehlani discusses their attempted suicide was due to the negative media response as well as their first major heartbreak. They state that their album was therapeutic through their difficult time. During their recovery, they got a tattoo that says "perdida y encontrada" which in English translates to "lost and found".

On their travels to Australia during August 2017, Kehlani received a "Kirituhi", a Maori tattoo from a New Zealand artist, whom they flew from New Zealand to Sydney, Australia to complete. On Kehlani's Instagram post, they captioned the photo: "[T]he piece representing my whānau/family, 6 koru representing my 4 siblings here on earth and the 2 that have transferred into the next life. 2 mangopare/hammerhead sharks representing guidance and strength through adversity and tribulation."

On January 5, 2018, Kehlani posted a photo to Instagram showing that their "woke" hand tattoo had been now covered up with a lotus flower; they stated that they felt that their "hand would speak for [them] before [they] even got a chance to open [their] mouth".

Discography

SweetSexySavage (2017)
It Was Good Until It Wasn't (2020)
 Blue Water Road (2022)

Filmography

Tours 
Headlining
 SweetSexySavage World Tour (2017)
 Blue Water Road Trip (2022)
Supporting
 Demi Lovato – Tell Me You Love Me World Tour (2018)
 Halsey – Hopeless Fountain Kingdom World Tour (2018)

Awards and nominations
{| class="wikitable sortable plainrowheaders" 
|-
! scope="col" | Award
! scope="col" | Year
! scope="col" | Nominee(s)
! scope="col" | Category
! scope="col" | Result
! scope="col" class="unsortable"| 
|-
!scope="row"|American Music Awards
| 2017
| rowspan=2|Themself
| Favorite Female Artist – Soul/R&B
| 
| 
|-
!scope="row" rowspan=5|BET Awards
| 2016
| Best New Artist
| 
| 
|-
| rowspan=2|2017
| "Distraction"
| Centric Award
| 
| rowspan=2|
|-
| rowspan=3|Themself
| rowspan=3|Best Female R&B/Pop Artist
| 
|-
| 2018
| 
| 
|-
| 2020
| 
| 
|-
!scope="row"|Billboard Music Awards
| 2021
| It Was Good Until It Wasn't
| Top R&B Album
| 
| 
|-
!scope="row"|Billboard Women in Music
| 2017
| rowspan=4|Themself
| Rulebreaker Award
| 
| 
|-
!scope="row" rowspan=2|British LGBT Awards
| 2018
| rowspan=2|MTV Music Artist
| 
| 
|-
| 2022
| 
| 
|-
!scope="row" rowspan=1 | Give Her FlowHERS Awards
| 2022
| The Alchemist Award
|
|
|-
!scope="row" rowspan=2|GLAAD Media Awards
| 2018
| SweetSexySavage
| rowspan=2|Outstanding Music Artist
| 
| 
|-
| 2021
| It Was Good Until It Wasn't
| 
| 
|-
!scope="row" rowspan=2|Grammy Awards
| 2016
| You Should Be Here
| Best Urban Contemporary Album
| 
| rowspan=2|
|-
| 2018
| "Distraction"
| Best R&B Performance
| 
|-
!scope="row"|iHeartRadio Music Awards
| 2018
| rowspan=3|Themself
| Best New R&B Artist
| 
| 
|-
!scope="row"|Queerty Awards
| 2022
| Closet Door Bustdown
| 
| 
|-
!scope="row"|Soul Train Music Awards
| 2017
| Best R&B/Soul Female Artist
| 
|

Notes

References

External links
 Official website
 
 

 
1995 births
21st-century American singers
African-American singers
American hip hop musicians
American hip hop singers
American contemporary R&B singers
American people who self-identify as being of Native American descent
American people of Filipino descent
American people of Mexican descent
Atlantic Records artists
LGBT people from California
American LGBT singers
American LGBT songwriters
Living people
Musicians from Oakland, California
Non-binary singers
Non-binary songwriters
American neo soul singers
American lesbian musicians
Singer-songwriters from California
African-American songwriters
Hispanic and Latino American dancers
Hispanic and Latino American singers
20th-century LGBT people
21st-century LGBT people
Polyamorous people